Matthew or Matt Miller may refer to:

Arts and entertainment
Matt K. Miller (born 1960), American voice actor
Matisyahu (Matthew Paul Miller, born 1979), American musician and reggae performer
Matthew Mercer (Matthew Christopher Miller, born 1982), American voice actor
Matt Miller (musician) (fl. 2002), American musician, bassist for the post-hardcore band Sparta
Matthew Miller (drummer) (fl. 2007–2017), American musician, drummer for Cymbals Eat Guitars
Matt Miller (The Young and the Restless), a character from the CBS soap opera The Young and the Restless

Sports

American football
Matt Miller (offensive lineman) (born 1956), American football offensive lineman
Matt Miller (wide receiver) (born 1991), American football wide receiver
Matt Miller (quarterback) (fl. 1995), American football quarterback

Other sports
Matt Miller (right-handed pitcher) (born 1971), American MLB baseball pitcher with the Colorado Rockies and Cleveland Indians
Matt Miller (left-handed pitcher) (born 1974), American MLB baseball pitcher with the Detroit Tigers
Matthew Miller (basketball) (born 1982), American basketball player for Rwandan national team
Matthew Miller (rower) (born 1989), American rower

Others
Matthew Miller (journalist) (born 1962), American journalist and broadcaster
Matthew Todd Miller (born 1989), American citizen detained in North Korea in 2014
Matthew Miller (academic), American physician and professor at Harvard School of Public Health